Santa Maria di Leuca lighthouse is an active light located at the extremity of Santa Maria di Leuca nearby the same name Sanctuary.

Description
The lighthouse was built in 1864 on project by Achille Rossi and was lit for the first time on September 6, 1866. The tower, built in bricks, has an hexagonal prism shape with balcony and lantern atop a two-storey keeper's house. The light is operated by the Lighthouses Service of Marina Militare identified by the code number 3388 E.F.

See also
List of lighthouses in Italy

References

External links

 Servizio Fari Marina Militare

Lighthouses in Italy